Pyrus is a julekalender (Christmas Calendar) TV series broadcast on the Danish television station TV2 at Christmas time in Denmark. Initially broadcast as four semi-independent seasons, the series consists of Alletiders Jul (1994), Alletiders Nisse (1995), Alletiders Julemand (1997), and Alletiders Eventyr (2000), as well as a spin-off feature film, Pyrus på Pletten, which premiered on Christmas Eve 2000.

The series is about Pyrus, a nisse or tomten, a term which is cognate with elf, but in this case specifically a Christmas elf, who lives inside of a box in the National Archives of Denmark with other nissers named Kandis and Gyldengrød. Gyldengrød is the nisse archivist and Pyrus and Kandis are his two apprentices. The human archivist is called Birger Bertramsen and he also has a trainee, his daughter Josefine Brahe. The humans and the nisser both study national history, though in different ways. The nisser can conjure themselves into history books and gather first-hand information from the historical people inside the books, while the humans conduct more traditional research from the historical documents in the Archive.

The series' central plot is about Pyrus and his friends' exploration of the History of Denmark, especially the history of Danish Christmas and its related concepts, and the titles are a double entendre, playing on the meaning of Alletiders as meaning both Great and Of all times. The first season, from 1994, was called Alletiders Jul, (Christmas for the Ages) followed by Alletiders Nisse (Nisse for the Ages); Alletiders Julemand (Santa Claus for the Ages) and Alletiders Eventyr (Fairytale for the Ages), with the concepts of, respectively, Christmas in general; the Nisse; the figure of Santa Clause; and Fairy Tales being the central theme of each series.

Main cast
Jan Linnebjerg as Pyrus, the young apprentice to the Archive Nisse at the National Archive in Copenhagen.
Paul Hüttel as Guttenborg/Gyldengrød, the Archive Nisse.
Jesper Klein as Birger Bertramsen, the human Archivist, who lives illegally in his office at the Archive.
Jeanne Boel as Josefine Brahe, Bertramsen's secretary, who is also his daughter.
Christiane Bjørg Nielsen as Kandis, Pyrus's fellow apprentice at the Archive. First appearance in Alletiders Nisse.
Søren Østergaard as Leif-Jørgen Krusø, a policeman assigned to investigate the Archive over Christmas, later Josefine's husband. First appearance in Alletiders Julemand.
Karen Gardelli as Freja, a young woman with amnesia, who can't recall which book she fell out of. Only appearance in Alletiders Jul.
Steen Stig Lommer as Uffe Andersen, a computer expert assigned to reform the Archive over Christmas. Only appearance in Alletiders Nisse.
Henrik H. Lund as Julle/Santa Clause. Only appearance in Alletiders Julemand.
Niccié and Nicolé Jølst as Mille and Molly, the twin nieces of Krusø. Only appearance in Alletiders Eventyr.

The plots

Alletiders Jul

On the first of December, Pyrus, a young, undisciplined and lazy nisse, arrives at the Nissebo (eng. Nisse Dwelling) in the National Archives of Denmark. He is going to be the Archive Nisse Gyldengrød's trainee for a year, but Pyrus only cares about eating and sleeping. Gyldengrød, an old and very intelligent nisse, tries to get Pyrus a little more interested in the history of Denmark, but Pyrus finds it boring. In the human world archivist Bertramsen is met by his new secretary Josefine Brahe the same day.

As soon as Gyldengrød leaves Pyrus alone with his spell book, however, Pyrus gets curious and tries to do some magic. But Pyrus makes a mess of it, conjuring an earthquake, and in the ensuing wreckage finds a girl with amnesia, who has presumably fallen out of one of the books in the archive. The next day, Gyldengrød discovers that the problem is much bigger than first assumed, because apparently Christmas has disappeared. Nobody outside of the archive has any recollection of Christmas, only Gyldengrød, Pyrus, Bertramsen and Josefine. Through 24 episodes Gyldengrød, Pyrus and the amnesic Freja are searching for Christmas, and for Freja's identity, in the history of Denmark by using magic to interact within the history books, and Betramsen and Brahe is rediscovering and reintroducing Christmas by studying the history of Denmark.

Alletiders Jul was broadcast on TV2 in 1994 and again in 2004.

Alletiders Nisse
Pyrus has just got home from the nisse university and is planning on relaxing during his vacation. Unfortunately, as Gyldengrød reminds him, the nisse university students have to write a paper during their holiday. Pyrus's assignment for the paper is the question "Hvad er en nisse?" (eng. What is a nisse?). Pyrus finds out he has to work with a classmate, the sweet and very clever female nisse Kandis, to complete the task. Through the 24 episodes of the series, Pyrus and Kandis travel into a variety of books of fiction, fairytales, fables, children's books and other literature to research their papers.

In the human world, the National Archives of Denmark is going to be torn down, and all the national history digitized and moved to EDP. An EDP-expert, Uffe Andersen, is going to digitize the entire collection. Bertramsen and Josefine try to convince the government not to tear down the Archives by proving something you can't prove by searching on the Internet: nisser exist! Through the series, Bertramsen and Josephine read everything about nisser, but as nobody has ever seen a nisse before they can't prove their existence. But one day, without realizing it, Uffe Andersen locks Kandis inside a closet. The only way Pyrus and Gyldengrød can rescue Kandis is by contacting the humans, breaking nisser law by showing themselves to the humans.

Alletiders Nisse was broadcast on TV2 in 1995 and again in 2006.

Alletiders Julemand
Pyrus is unsatisfied with the fact that nisser do not get presents from Santa Claus at Christmas Time. He writes a letter for Santa Claus resulting in Santa Claus arriving at the National Archives of Denmark the next day. Without knowing the fact that Santa Claus is already there, Pyrus steals Gyldengrød's magic book and tries to bring Santa Claus to the Archives from a book about Santa Claus, resulting in a Santa Claus with amnesia. Christmas is in a big danger because if there's no Santa Claus, there are no Christmas presents, and if there are no Christmas presents, then there will be a very sad Christmas. Pyrus, Gyldengrød, Kandis, Bertramsen and Josefine are all together trying to rediscover the myth about Santa Claus while they teach Santa about himself in hope that he might turn in to Santa Claus again.

Alletiders Julemand was broadcast on TV2 in 1997 and again in 2007 and 2014.

Alletiders Eventyr
Bertramsen is assigned by the Royal Family to assemble a collection of fairy tales for the newborn prince, but, by accident, Pyrus manages to magically combine all of the fairy tales into one large book of randomly jumbled snippets of stories. Meanwhile, Krusø is looking after his nieces over Christmas, and, while playing with the nisser, one of the twins get lost in the book. Pyrus, Kandis, Gyldengrød, Bertramsen and Josefine now have to find the lost girl, as well as rediscover all of the fairy tales to get them back in place in time for Christmas.

Alletiders Eventyr was broadcast on TV2 in 2000.

Christmas television specials
1990s Danish television series
2000s Danish television series
1994 Danish television series debuts
Danish-language television shows
Christmas television series